Georg August Friedrich Hermann Schulz (9 October 1893 – 25 September 1946), better known as Heinrich George, was a German stage and film actor.

Career

Weimar Republic
George is noted for having spooked the young Bertolt Brecht in his first directing job, a production of Arnolt Bronnen's Parricide (1922), when he refused to continue working with the director.

He appeared in Fritz Lang's Metropolis (1927) and
Dreyfus (1930), as well as starring in Berlin Alexanderplatz (1931).

George was an active member of the Communist party during the Weimar Republic.  He worked with theatre director  Erwin Piscator and playwright Bertolt Brecht, both of whom identified with the political left.

On 12 October 1932, he changed his legal name to his stage name George.

Nazi era
After the Nazi takeover, George was classified as a "non-desirable" actor at first because of his earlier political affiliations and was thus barred from working in cinematic productions. However, he was eventually able to reach an accommodation with the Nazi regime.  In 1937, George was designated as a Staatsschauspieler (i.e. an actor of national importance) and in 1938 was appointed director of the Schiller Theater in Berlin.  George actively collaborated with the Nazis and agreed to star in Nazi propaganda films such as Hitler Youth Quex (1933), Jud Süß (1940), and Kolberg (1945) as well as appearing in numerous newsreels.

George had a stocky build and a Berlin accent which made him readily recognizable to German audiences.  George's prestige as a leading actor of the day made him an "extraordinarily valuable catch for the Nazis."  Cooke and Silberman describe him as "the actor most closely tied with fascist fantasies of the autocratic and the populist leader".

Postwar
Although Heinrich George had been a member of the Communist Party of Germany before the Nazi takeover, he was nonetheless interned as a Nazi collaborator by Soviet occupying forces at the NKVD special camp Nr. 7 in Sachsenhausen where he died in 1946.

The cause of his death was starvation, even though official reports stated that he died "after an appendix operation".

Personal life
Heinrich George married the German actress Berta Drews. They had two sons: Jan George and actor Götz George.

Filmography

References

Further reading 
 Berta Drews: Wohin des Wegs: Erinnerungen. Langen Müller, 1986. 
 Peter Laregh: Heinrich George. Komödiant seiner Zeit. Langen Müller (Herbig), München 1992, 
 Werner Maser: Heinrich George. Mensch, aus Erde gemacht. Quintessenz Verlag, 1998, 
 Kurt Fricke: Spiel am Abgrund. Heinrich George – eine politische Biographie. Mitteldeutscher Verlag, 2000, 
 Kurt Fricke: Heinrich George, in: Bernd Heidenreich/Sönke Neitzel (eds.): Medien im Nationalsozialismus. Schöningh Paderborn, 2010, S. 83–107, 
 Michael Klonovsky, Jan von Flocken: Stalins Lager in Deutschland 1945–1950. Dokumentation – Zeugenberichte. Ullstein-Verlag, 1991, 
 Horst Mesalla: Heinrich George. Rekonstruktion der schauspielerischen Leistung unter besonderer Berücksichtigung der zeitgenössischen Publizistik. Dissertation, Freie Universität Berlin, 1969.

External links
 
Virtual History - Bibliography and Tobacco cards

1893 births
1946 deaths
Actors from Szczecin
People from the Province of Pomerania
German male film actors
German male silent film actors
German male stage actors
People who died in NKVD special camp Nr. 7
Deaths by starvation
20th-century German male actors